The Sioux City Packers was the primary name of the minor league baseball team based in Sioux City, Iowa playing in various seasons between 1888 and 1960.

History

Sioux City has a long professional baseball history. The team was known as the Sioux City Soos (1947-1958; 1940-1941; 1903-1904), Sioux City Cowboys (1934-1939), Sioux City Cardinals (1924),  Sioux City Packers (1920-1923; 1905-1913), Sioux City Indians (1914-1919), Sioux City Cornhuskers (1894, 1900, 1902) and the Sioux City Huskers (1888-1891). Sioux City played in the Western League (1960–1973), Three-I League (1911-1932, 1946-1956), Central Association (1908-1910), Iowa State League (1907) and the Western Association (1884). Sioux City was an affiliate of the New York Giants (1947-1955), St. Louis Cardinals (1941, 1956), Kansas City A's (1959-1960) and the Detroit Tigers (1937, 1939).

Notable alumni

Baseball Hall of Fame Alumni

 Dave Bancroft (1936) Inducted, 1971

 Jim Bottomley (1920) Inducted, 1974

Notable alumni

 Norm Bass (1960) Played in NFL and MLB. Paralympic Games medalist.
 George Bradley (1889) 1876 NL ERA Leader

 Eddie Bressoud (1951-1952) MLB All-Star

 George Burns (1913) 1926 AL Most Valuable Player

 Bert Cunningham (1894)

 Dave Garcia (1947, 1954)

 Billy Gardner (1950)

 Jack Glasscock (1900) 1890 NL Batting Title

 Danny Green (1908-1909)

 Ducky Holmes (1908-1909, 1912-1913, 1918)

 Dick Howser (1959-1960) 2 x MLB All-Star; Manager: 1985 World Series Champion - Kansas City Royals

 Willie Kirkland (1955)

 Ray Mueller (1952-1953) MLB All-Star

 Hi Myers (1911-1912)

 Art Nehf (1913)

 Johnny Niggeling (1947)

 John O'Donoghue (1960) MLB All-Star

 Ed Phelps (1915)

 Jack Pfiester (1916) 1907 NL ERA Title
 Diego Segui (1960) 1970 AL ERA Title
 Hank Severeid (1908)

 Daryl Spencer (1950)

 Bill White (1954) 8 x MLB All-Star

Year-by-year record

References

Baseball teams established in 1905
Defunct minor league baseball teams
Illinois-Indiana-Iowa League teams
Defunct baseball teams in Iowa
Professional baseball teams in Iowa
1905 establishments in Iowa
Defunct Tri-State League teams
Defunct Western League teams